Ber is both a given name and a surname. Notable people with the name include:

Dov Ber of Mezeritch (c. 1704 – 1772), Volhynian Orthodox rabbi
Avrom Ber Gotlober (1811–1899), Jewish writer, poet, playwright, historian, journalist and educator
Ber Borochov (1881–1917), Marxist Zionist
Ber Groosjohan (1897–1971), Dutch footballer
Boruch Ber Leibowitz (1870–1940), Haredi rabbi
Dov Ber Abramowitz (1860–1926), American Orthodox rabbi and author
José Ber Gelbard (1917–1977), Argentine activist and politician
Josef Ber, Australian actor
Yisroel Ber Odesser (1888–1994), controversial figure in the Breslov movement

See also 
 Berek (disambiguation), diminutive, later separate name
 Baruch (given name)